The PCC (Presidents' Conference Committee) is a streetcar (tram) design that was first built in the United States in the 1930s. The design proved successful in its native country, and after World War II it was licensed for use elsewhere in the world where PCC based cars were made. The PCC car has proved to be a long-lasting icon of streetcar design, and many remain in service around the world.

Origins
The "PCC", or "Presidents' Conference Committee", originated from the design committee formed in 1929. It was renamed the "Electric Railway Presidents' Conference Committee" (ERPCC) in 1931. The group's membership consisted primarily of representatives of several large operators of U.S. urban electric street railways plus potential manufacturers. Three interurban lines and at least one "heavy rail", or rapid transit, operator—Chicago Rapid Transit Company—were represented as well. Also included on the membership roll were manufacturers of surface cars (streetcars) and interested component suppliers.

ERPCC's goal was to design a streamlined, comfortable, quiet, and fast accelerating and braking streetcar that would be operated by a seated operator using floor mounted pedal controls to better meet the needs of the street railways and appeal to riders. ERPCC prepared a detailed research plan, conducted extensive research on streetcar design, built and tested components, made necessary modifications and revisions based upon the findings, and ultimately produced a set of specifications for a standardized and fixed design. It included a modest list of available options with ample room for customer customization but was to be built with standard parts as opposed to a custom designed car body with diverse parts added depending on the whims and requirements of the individual customer. Numerous national and international users operated large fleets of PCC cars for many years.

Many design patents resulted from the work of ERPCC. These were transferred to a new business entity called the Transit Research Corporation (TRC) when ERPCC expired in 1936. Although this company continued the work of research on improvements to the basic design of the car and issued sets of specifications three times in the ensuing years, because TRC defined a PCC car as any vehicle which used patents on which it collected royalties, it was formed for the primary purpose of controlling those patents and promoting the standardization envisioned by the ERPCC. The company was funded by its collection of patent royalties from the railways which bought PCC cars. The company was controlled by a voting trust representing the properties which had invested in the work of ERPCC. One participant in Committee meetings, Philadelphia trolley manufacturer JG Brill Company brought a competitive design—the Brilliner—to market in 1938. Because Raymond Loewy designed elements that were very similar to the PCC look, the Brilliner attracted no large orders, being built only for Atlantic City Transit and the Red Arrow Lines in suburban Philadelphia. Fewer than 50 were sold.

A significant contribution to the PCC design was noise reduction with extensive use of rubber in springs and other components to prevent rattle, vibration, and thus noise and to provide a level of comfort unknown before. Wheel tires were mounted between rubber sandwiches and were electrically isolated so that shunts were required to complete a ground. Resilient wheels were used on most PCC cars, with later heftier versions known as "Super-Resilient".

Gears were another source of considerable noise, solved by employing hypoid gears which are mounted at a right angle to the axle, where three of the six teeth constantly engaged the main gear, reducing lash and noise. All movable truck parts employed rubber for noise reduction as well. "Satisfactory Cushion Wheel of Vital Importance; Develop New Truck Design; Generous Use of Rubber" are headings within a paper that Chief Engineer Clarence F. Hirshfeld both presented and published.

After a specification document suitable for purchasing cars was generated by TRC, orders were placed by eight companies in 1935 and 1936. First was Brooklyn & Queens Transit Corporation (B&QT) for 100 cars, then Baltimore Transit Co. (BTCo) for 27 cars, Chicago Surface Lines (CSL) for 83 cars, Pittsburgh Railways Co. (PRCO) for 101 cars, San Diego Electric Railway (SDERy) for 25 cars, Los Angeles Railway (LARy) for 60 cars, and then Boston Elevated Railway (BERy) for one car. In late 1935 or early in 1936 Westinghouse Electric Corporation pressed for one car to be equipped with their electrical equipment for testing in Pittsburgh, since the Brooklyn order would have all cars equipped by General Electric, and Clark Equipment Company pressed for one car to be made by them of aluminum for delivery to B&QT. Agreements among the parties were reached whereby St Louis Car Company would build 101 essentially identical cars and Clark would build one of its own body design.

Brooklyn received its first car number 1001 on May 28, 1936, PRCo took delivery of car number 100 on July 26, 1936, and Baltimore received its first car on September 2, 1936. In the late 1936 discussions of operating experience, it was noted that the Brooklyn car had run 3,000 miles by the time the Pittsburgh car had run 1,000 miles. One of the key patents was filed by Dan H. Bell on January 8, 1937, and granted on July 5, 1938, and entitled, "Rail Car or Similar Article," Patent No. 110,384. The first car to be placed in a scheduled public service was PRCo 100 in August and B&QT launched its first scheduled service with a group of cars on October 1, 1936, followed by CSL on November 13, 1936. Production continued in North America by St. Louis Car Co. and Pullman Standard until 1952, with 4,978 units being built. Under license to use the designs patented by TRC, thousands more PCC and partially PCC type cars were produced in Europe through the last half of the 20th century. The cars were well-built, and many hundreds are still in operation. The majority of large North American streetcar systems surviving after 1935 purchased PCC streetcars; those systems which eventually terminated streetcar operations often sold their cars to surviving operators.

The Melbourne & Metropolitan Tramways Board (MMTB) in Australia was keen to build two new tram routes after World War II, and these routes would be served by PCC Streetcars. The MMTB decided that it was too expensive and Melbourne only ever had two PCC streetcars, of which one was a prototype for a completely different class.

Several dozen remain in public transit service, such as the in Boston, and in Philadelphia, Kenosha, San Diego and San Francisco following extensive overhauling. All other surviving and functional North American PCC cars are operated by museums and heritage railways. Several retired PCCs from Boston, Cleveland, and Philadelphia were purchased as scrap and have been privately stored just outside Windber, Pennsylvania since 1992.

Washington, D.C., PCCs were unique because of conduit plows which collected current from a slot between the rails into which the plow dipped, contacting positive and negative rails under the street on either side. At the city limits were "plow pits", where the plow was dropped and removed, the trolley pole raised, and the car then continued along using overhead wire. The process was reversed in the opposite direction into Washington.

"The PCC car was not just another modular vehicle but the result of the only systems engineering approach to mass producing a rail car." Research into passenger comfort resulting from vibrations, acceleration, lighting, heating and cooling, seat spacing, cushion height, space for arms, legs, standing passengers, economies of weight affecting maintenance, cost of power, reduced wear of components and track. Dimensions were established to fit the majority but could easily be changed for special situations. Windows were spaced to match seating.

While some of the components in the PCC car had been used before—resilient wheels, magnetic braking, sealed gears, and modular design to name a few—the ERPCC redesigned, refined, and perfected many of these while developing new acceleration and braking controls and put them all in one package.

Manufacturing

PCC cars were initially built in the United States by the St Louis Car Company (SLCCo) and Pullman Standard. Clark Equipment built the only aluminum-body PCC as well as all narrow gauge B1 trucks for Los Angeles, all the standard and broad gauge B2 trucks both air- and all-electric, and the B2B trucks used under PRCo 1725–1799 and Toronto 4500–4549.
 SLCCo built all B3 trucks, both standard and broad gauge.
 PCC cars for Canadian cities were assembled in Montreal, Quebec by Canadian Car & Foundry from bodies and trucks supplied by St. Louis Car.

Westinghouse (Westinghouse Electric, Westinghouse Air Brake Company, Canadian Westinghouse Co.) and General Electric both supplied electrical packages and brake components which were designed and built in cooperation with the ERPCC. The customer specified the equipment, which was to be installed, performance was similar, and most cities ordered from both suppliers. Since Westinghouse was home based near Pittsburgh, PRCo ordered 75% of its PCC fleet with Westinghouse equipment, the balance with GE. Indeed, PCCs are often identified as either Westinghouse or GE.

The last PCC streetcars built for any North American system were a batch of 25 for the San Francisco Municipal Railway, manufactured by the St Louis Car Company and delivered in 1951–2.

Approximately 4,586 PCC cars were purchased by United States transit companies – 1052 by Pullman Standard and 3534 by St. Louis. Most transit companies purchased one type, but Chicago, Baltimore, Cleveland, and Shaker Heights operated both examples. The Baltimore Transit Co. (BTC) considered the Pullman cars of superior construction. The St. Louis cars had a more aesthetically pleasing design with a more rounded front and rear plus other fancy frills. The BTC found the Pullman cars easier to work on. St. Louis cars had compound curved wheel wells.

Performance
Westinghouse developed the XD-323 rotary accelerator for motor control with 99 points. It was installed in the first PRCo car, number 100, and minor modifications allowed use in the last PCCs produced in North America for San Francisco in 1952. Prior streetcar control, existing from the 1890s, required a standing operator at a three-foot-high vertical "switch stand" to rotate a handle to one of six brass points mounted within the stand to provide traction motor control and acceleration. The PCC had its accelerator under the floor where the pedal activated linkage to resistance ribbons were mounted to each PCC point around the outside edge of the accelerator. An arm rotating in the center had rollers on either end which cut out resistance alternately as it rotated approximately 180 degrees. This same accelerator was also used for dynamic braking; when the power pedal was released the accelerator sought optimum braking for the speed, which prevented a lag when the brake pedal was depressed. General Electric developed a control system for PCC cars that mirrored the Westinghouse scheme in function, although not in simplicity or maintainability. With the GE commutator motor controller operating by air pressure, it had to be redesigned with the advent of the All-Electric PCC. Acceleration was variable between 1.5- and 4.75-mph per second depending upon the depression of the power pedal with the accelerator advanced automatically by a low-voltage pilot motor. Service braking was also variable and the maximum dynamic application decreased speed by 4.75-mph/s; pressing the brake pedal into emergency also brought the friction and magnetic brakes into play providing a maximum deceleration of 9.0-mph/s. Compared to a maximum of 14 points on old time equipment, the PCC was considerably smoother.

Most PCCs employed three pedals with a dead man's switch to the left, brake in center, and power pedal on the right. Depressing the brake about half-way and then releasing the deadman pedal put the PCC in "park". Lifting the deadman alone would apply all brakes, drop sand, and balance the doors so they could be pushed open easily. Chicago used "bicycle-type levers" for power and brake but converted some cars to two pedals. St. Louis Public Service Co. (SLPS) used two pedals, both with heel interlocks. The right pedal is the brake; depressing this pedal about halfway while lifting away from the heel applied "park". Once the brake is released the heel need not be engaged with the interlock (although a professional driver is to cover the brake at all times.) The left pedal applied the power and the heel interlock had to be engaged at all times since it was the deadman; only when the brake was in "park" could the deadman be disengaged.

SLPS is unique in that all 300 of their PCCs are All-Electric with the 1500s ordered in late 1939, the 1600s ordered late 1940s and the 1700s in January 1945. SLPS was the rolling laboratory for All-Electrics and what was learned here was applied to the post-WW2 All-Electric Demonstrator in the Fall of 1945.

From 1936 to 1945, PCC cars were "Air-Electrics" with friction brakes, doors, and windshield wipers operated by air pressure. PRCo PCC 1600 of 1945 was the post WW2 All-Electric Demonstrator which eliminated the air compressor and associated piping while incorporating such features as standee windows, a sloped windshield to eliminate nighttime glare, redesigned back end, forced-air ventilation, and other features. Dynamic brakes were the service brake on all PCCs; when almost stopped, friction brakes completed the stop and held the car in "park". Dynamic brakes slowed the "Air" cars to 3.0-mph at which point a lock-out relay allowed automatic application of air-applied friction brakes against each of the eight wheels. On All-Electric cars the dynamics were effective to 0.75-mph where the lockout relay then allowed a spring applied friction brake to engage a drum on each of the four motor drive shafts; this completed the stop and held the car in park. Drum brakes were released by an electric solenoid operating from low-voltage battery power; a power failure would prevent the drums from releasing which would prevent power application, a fail-safe feature. Drum brakes were quite popular and greatly reduced maintenance thus some "Air" cars were retrofitted with drums. Four magnetic brakes, one between the wheels on each side of each truck, applied additional braking for emergency stopping where all brakes were generally employed.

"These performances [acceleration and braking] enable the P.C.C. car to out-pace the average automobile which, in America, is of substantially higher performance than the typical British vehicle." This, of course, is only true when comparing to the automobiles of that period.

Body variations

Two main body standards were made, 1936 and 1945, sometimes called pre-war and post-war, the most prominent difference being the windows.

The pre-war cars usually had a right side arrangement of front door, five windows, center door, five windows, and one large rear quarter window.

Post war cars had a rationalized window arrangement. The windows and pillars were narrower, and there were small "standee" windows above each window. Right side arrangement usually was front door, 7 windows, side door, four windows, and two rear quarter windows. Other body differences were a recessed windshield and wider doors. There were far fewer variations of this style, width being the most common.

Only Dallas ordered standard size double ended cars. All double ended cars retained the pre-war style body until the end of production.

Rapid transit cars
There were four rapid transit companies on the committee, but the primary focus was streetcars, rapid transit development was slower. The difference in operations between the systems also made standardization difficult.

By 1940, Brooklyn had five three-section articulated trainsets with PCC components, after WWII Chicago ordered four similar trainsets. Chicago ordered two from Pullman and two from St. Louis, with different equipment, so that competing manufacturers could be directly compared. Experience from the trainsets influenced the following car standards.

Number and type of doors and windows, interior layout, and width of cars varied with each system.

Trucks were a major focus, both Clark and St. Louis developed trucks with  wheels and a  maximum speed, but only Boston used them, Clark B10s on 40 cars. When Clark stopped building railroad equipment in 1952 PCC trucks were no longer available, Boston and Cleveland then used non PCC trucks with  wheels.

Chicago ordered the first of 770 (720 + 50 double-ended) 6000 series cars in 1948 (before the standard, which they influenced), Boston (40, then later 100) in 1950, and Cleveland (70 + 18 double-ended) in 1952. Chicago's first 200 cars were entirely new, but in 1953 they started using components salvaged from new, but no longer needed, streetcars. Toronto, on the committee, did not buy any, nor did Brooklyn, who had bought the first five trainsets.

240 PCC rapid transit cars were built in four years, from 1948 to 1952, then 438 cars with non-PCC trucks until 1957, the last of Chicago's 570 cars built with salvaged components were delivered in 1958. Some Chicago cars were in regular service in 1990, car number 30 made its last revenue run in 1999.

PCC fleets

Historical

Current

Most PCC-based systems were dismantled in the post-war period in favor of bus-based transit networks. Of the rail transit systems that survived this period, most had replaced their PCCs with modern light rail vehicles (LRVs) by the early 1980s. Beginning in the late 1990s, several cities began to make use of historic PCCs to serve historic streetcar lines that combined aspects of tourist attractions and transit. The following is a table of places where transit agencies still employ PCCs in revenue service as opposed to a short-run or intermittent heritage railway.

The Ashmont–Mattapan High-Speed Line in Boston is a light-rail extension of the MBTA's heavy Red Line. It runs from the Ashmont terminus of the Red Line to Mattapan, and runs PCCs exclusively. The line was shut down for reconstruction from June 24, 2006, until December 22, 2007, but PCC cars have resumed operation since the line's bridges cannot support heavier light rail vehicles (LRV) operated on the MBTA's Green Line. Not considered historic equipment, the PCC cars in use on the Mattapan–Ashmont line represent the oldest cars still in revenue service, originally built between 1943 and 1946. These cars are also the only air-electric PCCs still in regular service in North America. Several retired PCCs from Boston are now at the Seashore Trolley Museum.

The McKinney Avenue Transit Authority in Dallas, Texas, owns three PCC cars, two from Toronto, one from the former Tandy Center Subway.  One of the ex Toronto cars is currently in service.

Officials in El Paso expressed their desire to preserve the history of the city by refurbishing the old PCC streetcars that once made their way through Downtown from 1949 to 1974. They operated on the international streetcar line that connected El Paso, Texas in the United States, with Ciudad Juárez, Mexico. Originally, the line operated until 1973. Six cars in total have been restored, regular revenue operations began in late 2018 for the downtown loop.

The Kenosha Electric Streetcar in Kenosha, Wisconsin, has been operating six ex-Toronto Transit Commission PCCs (five since 2000 and the sixth since 2009) and one ex-SEPTA car since 2009. The Kenosha Electric is unique among modern PCC operations in that PCCs had not run in the city before 2000—the original rail system was shut down in 1932 before any PCC cars had been built. Two of its cars are still painted in their original TTC colours, while the rest have been re-decorated in the liveries of several U.S. cities including Pittsburgh, Johnstown, Chicago and Cincinnati.

SEPTA restored trolley service to the Route 15 Girard Avenue line in Philadelphia in September 2005 after a 15-year "temporary" suspension of trolley service in favor of diesel buses. The line uses restored and modernized (by the Brookville Manufacturing Company) PCC cars, known as PCC-IIs, painted in their original green and cream Philadelphia Transit Company livery, rather than SEPTA's white with red and blue stripes. Modernization included all-new control systems, modern turn markers, HVAC system (which accounts for the noticeably larger roof enclosure), and ADA compliant wheelchair lifts. The line runs from Haddington to Port Richmond down the median of Girard Avenue. It crosses both the Broad Street Subway and the Market-Frankford Line, and stops at the Philadelphia Zoo, among other landmarks. SEPTA had originally planned to run modern Kawasaki trolleys along the line once service was restored, but a combination of economics and a desire to help revive the Girard Avenue corridor with a more "romantic" vehicle led to the agency restoring the old vehicles for about half the cost of new cars. SEPTA uses Kawasaki vehicles on the rest of its trolley lines, including the Subway-Surface Green Line linking West Philadelphia with Center City and its 69th Street Terminal with the western suburbs of Media and Sharon Hill via light rail routes 101 and 102.

San Diego Trolley currently uses 2 PCCs and is in the process of determining viability of a third car as of 2016. They are in use on the Silver Line which opened in 2011 and runs in a clockwise loop around Downtown San Diego.

The F Market Line (historic streetcar service) in San Francisco, opened in 1995, runs along Market Street from The Castro to the Ferry Building, then along the Embarcadero north and west to Fisherman's Wharf. This line is run by a mixture of PCC cars built between 1946 and 1952, and earlier pre-PCC cars. Due to its success, a second heritage line was inaugurated in 2015, the E Embarcadero, which serves to facilitate a one-seat ride from the Caltrain San Francisco Station to Fisherman's Wharf. Although San Francisco had removed PCCs from revenue service when the city's light rail was transformed into the Muni Metro system in 1980, they had made occasional festival trips in the ensuing years before being returned to full-time service. Car 1074 is painted in Toronto Transit Commission livery, but was never owned by the TTC. 

The first PCC cars in Canada were operated by the Toronto Transit Commission (TTC) in 1938. By 1954, Toronto had the largest PCC fleet in the world, including many purchased second-hand from U.S. cities that abandoned streetcar service following the Second World War. Although it acquired new custom-designed streetcars in the late 1970s and 1980s (and which was replaced by modern LRVs by Dec. 2019), the TTC continued using PCCs in regular service until 1995, and retains two (numbers 4500 and 4549) for charter purposes.

Models based on the PCC streetcar
The PCC license was used worldwide after World War II had ended which resulted in adaptations based on the American PCC design. Two such licensees were successful, namely the Belgian company La Brugeoise et Nivelles (since 1988 a subsidiary of Bombardier Transportation), who built both standard-gauge and meter-gauge cars based on the PCC license for many networks in Belgium, France and the Netherlands; and particularly the Czech ČKD Tatra, who built the largest number of the PCC type in the world, supplying a number of Central and Eastern European countries. Trams such as the Tatra T3 and its variant Tatra T4, together the most numerous of any tram model ever produced, are still in service today in many of the regions where they were first introduced. Modern variants of the Tatra T3 are still produced today by some manufacturers, such as KOS Krnov. The Polish Konstal 13N was not built under license. Only models with direct references to the original American PCC streetcar are included here. Later models of a particular series such as the Tatra T5 were adapted and modernized further. 

Note that the country listed only covers areas where the cars were initially delivered; references for these areas can be found in the text.

The first PCC cars in Brussels (series 7000–7100) were built in prevision of the Expo 58: they were single-body non-reversible two-bogie cars. Articulated trams arrived since 1965: first two-body non-reversible trams (series 7500) then two-body (series 7700–7800) and three-body (series 7900) reversible ones, the last one delivered in 1978. The last single-body PCC tram in commercial service in Brussels ran in February 2010. All series 7500 trams were converted to series 7700 by addition of a second steering post except the 7500 prototype which was versed to the collection of the Brussels Tram Museum. Two-body and three-body reversible PCC trams are still in regular service next to more modern low-floor trams. All these articulated PCC cars use Jacobs bogies under the articulations (see example at right).

Brussels tramways use standard gauge (1.435 m); metre-gauge PCC trams are in use in Ghent and Antwerp.

The only PCC in West Germany was delivered from La Brugeoise to Hamburg in 1951. The car was sold to Brussels in 1957. Returned to Hamburg in 1995, where it was used as a historical tram in the VVM Schönberger Strand museum. In 1999, the tram was sold to the Danish tram museum of Skjoldenaesholm.

These trams were used in Poland from 1959 to their retirement in 2012. Several remain as maintenance cars, while others have been preserved in museums. Konstal 13Ns were not produced under a PCC licence.

One set of PCC bogies and control equipment was imported into Melbourne circa 1949 and fitted to a modified W class body. Additional cars were planned, but never built. The single car was numbered 980, and was withdrawn from service in 1971. Z Class tram prototype car 1041 was built in 1972 using bogies salvaged from 980.

Only two of the planned 300 of the PCC A28 type trams had been delivered to Stockholm by ASJ in 1953. This was probably due to the withdrawal of the Polish side of the contract in 1946, which primarily stated the delivery not only of the tram wagons, but also 8 locomotives and 44 electric passenger trains by the ASEA company. The only ones that were built, based on bogies and the electrical system delivered from the USA. They were the first PCCs in Europe equipped with multiple-unit electrical systems and were only used in pairs (no more trams of this type were constructed) on tourist line number 700. In 1962, the routes were converted to buses. One of the two cars was scrapped, the other one (number 11) is preserved in the Tramway Museum of Malmkoping.

The TMBT (Tokyo Metropolitan Bureau of Transportation) wanted to modernize its streetcar, so ordered one PCC car to Naniwa Koki Company(later Alna Sharyo Company in Hankyu Hanshin Holdings) in Osaka in 1953. Sumitomo Metal Industries as bogie manufacturer, and Mitsubishi Electric Corporation that had the electric motor licensee from Westinghouse Electric Corporation, also participated in the project. The streetcar was completed in 1954 with number 5501. The class 5500 was extended with other 6 cars (5502–5507), but these were called no real PCC cars because of their different configuration.

See also
 Brilliner
 Russian PCC streetcars KTM-1, MTV-82 & RVZ-6
 Streetcars in North America

References

Further reading
 
 
 Carlson et al. (1986), The Colorful Streetcars We Rode, Bulletin 125 of the Central Electric Railfans' Association, Chicago, Il. 
 Kashin, S.; Demoro, H. (1986), An American Original: The PCC Car, Interurban Press, 
  López Bustos, Carlos, Tranvías de Madrid, Aldaba Ediciones, Madrid 1986,

External links

 
 
 
 
 
 Madrid trams (in Dutch)
 
 
 

Tram vehicles
Tram vehicles of Belgium
Tram vehicles of Canada
Tram vehicles of Mexico
Tram vehicles of Serbia
Tram vehicles of Spain
Streetcars of the United States
Tram vehicles of the Netherlands
600 V DC multiple units
Train-related introductions in 1936
750 V DC multiple units
Electric multiple units of the United States